Podlesie  is a village in the administrative district of Gmina Czarna, within Dębica County, Podkarpackie Voivodeship, in south-eastern Poland.

References

Podlesie